The governor of South Cotabato, is the chief executive of the provincial government of South Cotabato.

Provincial Governors (1967-2025)

References

Governors of South Cotabato
South Cotabato